Önskas is a 1991 Swedish comedy film directed by Lars Johansson. Rolf Lassgård was nominated for the award for Best Actor in a leading role at the 27th Guldbagge Awards.

Cast
 Rolf Lassgård as Bo Roine 'Bosse' Persson
 Mattias Holstensson as Morgan
 Marie Richardson as Anita
 Camilla Asp as Katty
 Martin Svalander as Dag
 Per Morberg as Per-Arne Tegesjöö
 Linus Selldén as Karl Tegesjöö
 Gerd Hegnell as Mrs. Hansson
 Halvar Björk as Pfeiffer
 Kristina Ström as Alma
 Olof Holm as Bergström

References

External links
 
 

1991 films
1991 comedy films
Swedish comedy films
1990s Swedish-language films
1990s Swedish films